Straw Dogs is a 1971 psychological thriller film directed by Sam Peckinpah and starring Dustin Hoffman and Susan George. The screenplay, by Peckinpah and David Zelag Goodman, is based upon Gordon M. Williams's 1969 novel, The Siege of Trencher's Farm. The film's title derives from a discussion in the Tao Te Ching that likens people to the ancient Chinese ceremonial straw dog, being of ceremonial worth, but afterwards discarded with indifference.

The film is noted for its violent concluding sequences and two complicated rape scenes, which were censored by numerous film rating boards. Released theatrically in the same year as A Clockwork Orange, The French Connection, and Dirty Harry, the film sparked heated controversy over a perceived increase of violence in films generally.

The film premiered in the UK in November 1971. Although controversial at the time, Straw Dogs is considered by some critics to be one of Peckinpah's greatest films, and was nominated for an Academy Award for Best Music (Original Dramatic Score). A remake directed by Rod Lurie and starring James Marsden and Kate Bosworth was released on September 16, 2011.

Plot

After securing a research grant to study stellar structures, American applied mathematician David Sumner moves with his attractive young wife Amy to a house near to her home village of Wakely on the Cornish moorland. Amy's ex-boyfriend Charlie Venner, along with his friends Norman Scutt, Chris Cawsey, and Phil Riddaway, immediately resent the fact that an apparently meek outsider has married one of their own. Scutt, a former convict, confides in Cawsey his jealousy of Venner's past relationship with Amy. David meets Venner's uncle, Tom Hedden, a violent drunkard whose teenage daughter Janice flirts with Henry Niles, a mentally deficient man despised by the entire town.

The Sumners have taken an isolated farmhouse, Trenchers Farm, that once belonged to Amy's father. They hire Scutt and Cawsey to re-roof its garage, and when impatient with lack of progress add Venner and his cousin Bobby to the workforce. Tensions in their marriage soon become apparent. Amy criticizes David's condescension towards her and his escape from a volatile, politicized university campus in America, suggesting that cowardice was his true reason for leaving. He withdraws deeper into his studies, ignoring both the hostility of the locals and Amy's dissatisfaction. His aloofness results in Amy's attention-gathering pranks and provocative demeanor towards the workmen, particularly Venner. David also struggles to be accepted by the educated locals, as shown in conversations with the vicar Reverend Barney Hood and his wife, and the local magistrate, Major John Scott.

When David finds their cat hanging dead in their bedroom, Amy believes that Cawsey or Scutt is responsible. She presses David to confront the workmen, but he is too intimidated. The men invite David to go hunting; they take him to the moors and leave him there with the promise of driving birds towards him. With David away from home, Venner goes to Trenchers Farm and pressures Amy sexually; after a time she submits. While they are still together, Scutt enters silently, motions Venner to move away at gunpoint and rapes Amy, with Venner holding her down. David returns much later, smarting from the men abandoning him. Amy says nothing about the rape, apart from a cryptic comment that escapes his attention.

David fires the workmen for their slow progress. Later, the Sumners attend a church social evening where Amy becomes distraught on seeing her rapists. Janice invites Henry to leave with her and, in a building hidden away from the crowd, she begins to seduce him. When Janice's brother notices that she is missing, he is sent to search for her, and as he calls out for her, Niles panics and kills Janice. The Sumners leave the social early, driving through thick fog, and accidentally hit Henry as he is escaping the scene. They take the injured Henry to their home and phone the pub to report the accident. The locals, who in the meantime have learned that Janice was last seen with Henry, are thereby alerted to his whereabouts. Soon, Hedden, Scutt, Venner, Cawsey and Riddaway are drunkenly pounding on the Sumners' door. Deducing their intention to lynch Henry, David refuses to let them take him, despite Amy's pleas. The standoff seems to unlock a territorial instinct in David: "I will not allow violence against this house."

Scott arrives to defuse the situation, but is accidentally shot dead by Hedden during a struggle. Realizing the danger to him in witnessing this killing, David improvises various traps and weapons to fend off the attackers. He inadvertently forces Hedden to shoot himself in the foot, knocks Riddaway unconscious and bludgeons Cawsey to death with a poker. Venner holds him at gunpoint, but Amy's screams alert both men when Scutt assaults her again. Scutt suggests Venner join him in another rape, but Venner shoots him dead. David disarms Venner and in the ensuing fight snaps his neck with a mantrap. Reviewing the resulting carnage and surprised by his own violence, David mutters to himself, "Jesus, I got 'em all." A recovering Riddaway then brutally attacks him, but is shot by Amy.

David gets into his car to drive Henry back to the village. Henry says he does not know his way home; David says he does not either.

Cast

Production
Sam Peckinpah's two previous films, The Wild Bunch and The Ballad of Cable Hogue, had been made for Warner Bros.-Seven Arts. His connection with the company ended after the chaotic filming of Cable Hogue wrapped 19 days over schedule and $3 million over budget (equivalent to $ million in ). Left with a limited number of directing jobs, Peckinpah was forced to travel to England to direct Straw Dogs. Produced by Daniel Melnick, who had previously worked with Peckinpah on his 1966 television film Noon Wine, the screenplay began from Gordon Williams' novel The Siege of Trencher's Farm, with Peckinpah saying "David Goodman and I sat down and tried to make something of validity out of this rotten book. We did. The only thing we kept was the siege itself".

Casting
Beau Bridges, Stacy Keach, Sidney Poitier, Jack Nicholson, and Donald Sutherland were considered for the lead role of David Sumner before Dustin Hoffman was cast. Hoffman agreed to do the film because he was intrigued by the character, a pacifist unaware of his feelings and potential for violence that were the same feelings he abhorred in society. Judy Geeson, Jacqueline Bisset, Diana Rigg, Helen Mirren, Carol White, Charlotte Rampling, and Hayley Mills were considered for the role of Amy before Susan George was finally selected. Hoffman disagreed with the casting, as he felt his character would never marry such a "Lolita-ish" kind of girl. Peckinpah insisted on George, a relatively unknown actress in the US at that time.

Filming

Location shooting took place around St Buryan near Penzance in Cornwall, including at St Buryan's Church. Interiors were shot at Twickenham Studios in London. The exterior shots for the siege scenes were filmed during night shoots in Cornwall, while the interior shots for the same scenes were filmed in London. The film's production design was by Ray Simm.

Reception

Box office
The film earned rentals of $4.5 million in North America and $3.5 million in other countries. By 1973 it had recorded an overall profit of $1,425,000.

Critical response
Roger Ebert of The Chicago Sun-Times gave the film 2 out of 4 stars and described the film as "a major disappointment in which Peckinpah's theories about violence seem to have regressed to a sort of 19th-Century mixture of Kipling and machismo." Vincent Canby of The New York Times called it "a special disappointment" that is "an intelligent movie, but interesting only in the context of his other works." Variety wrote, "The script (from Gordon M. Williams' novel The Siege of Trencher's Farm) relies on shock and violence to tide it over weakness in development, shallow characterization and lack of motivation." Gary Arnold of The Washington Post wrote, "People who are sensitive to both the sight and the implications of violence will probably be disgusted and angered by 'Straw Dogs' because there is no credible motivation for the violence. For the first time Peckinpah really seems to be specializing in violence rather than exploring its effects and meanings ... I would have walked out of 'Straw Dogs' at several points if I'd been anything but a professional critic."

Other reviews were positive. Paul D. Zimmerman of Newsweek stated, "It is hard to imagine that Sam Peckinpah will ever make a better movie than Straw Dogs. It flawlessly expresses his primitive vision of violence — his belief that manhood requires rites of violence, that home and hearth are inviolate and must be defended by blood, that a man must conquer other men to prove his courage and hold on to his woman." Gene Siskel of the Chicago Tribune gave the film 3 out of 4 stars and wrote that even though he disagreed with Peckinpah's apparent worldview that "Man is an animal, and his passion for destroying his own kind lies just beneath his skin," it was nevertheless "a superbly made movie. Peckinpah creates a mood of impending violence with great skill." Charles Champlin of the Los Angeles Times called it "an overpowering piece of storytelling, certain to remind every viewer of the wells of primal emotion lurking within himself, beneath the fragile veneer of civilized control. It is, I think, a better picture than 'The Wild Bunch,' less ritualistic and less appallingly graphic in its violence, and in fact less cynical."

Among later assessments, Entertainment Weekly in 1997 wrote that the contemporary interpretation was that of a "serious exploration of humanity's ambivalent relationship with the dark side", but it now seems an "exploitation bloodbath". Nick Schager of Slant Magazine rated it four out of four stars and wrote, "Sitting through Peckinpah's controversial classic is not unlike watching a lit fuse make its slow, inexorable way toward its combustible destination—the taut build-up is as shocking and vicious as its fiery conclusion is inevitable." Philip Martin of the Arkansas Democrat-Gazette wrote, "Peckinpah's Straw Dogs is a movie that has remained important to me for 40 years. Along with Stanley Kubrick's A Clockwork Orange, Straw Dogs stands as a transgressively violent, deeply '70s film; one that still retains its power to shock after all these years." The consensus reads: "A violent, provocative meditation on manhood, Straw Dogs is viscerally impactful -- and decidedly not for the squeamish."

The Original Score by Jerry Fielding was nominated at the 44th Academy Awards in 1971 for Best Music (Original Dramatic Score), his second nomination for a Sam Peckinpah film following The Wild Bunch in 1969.

Controversy
The film was controversial on its 1971 release, mostly because of the prolonged rape scene that is the film's centerpiece. Critics accused Peckinpah of glamorizing and eroticising rape and of engaging in misogynistic sadism and male chauvinism, especially disturbed by the scene's intended ambiguity—after initially resisting, Amy appears to enjoy parts of the first rape, kissing and holding her attacker, although she later has traumatic flashbacks. Author Melanie Williams, in her 2005 book, Secrets and Laws: Collected Essays in Law, Lives and Literature, stated, "the enactment purposely catered to entrenched appetites for desired victim behavior and reinforces rape myths".  Another criticism is that all the main female characters depict straight women as perverse, in that every appearance of Janice and Amy is used to highlight excessive sexuality.

The violence provoked strong reactions, many critics seeing it an endorsement of violence as redemption, and the film as fascist celebration of violence and vigilantism. Others see it as anti-violence, describing the bleak ending consequent to the violence. Dustin Hoffman viewed David as deliberately, yet subconsciously, provoking the violence, his concluding homicidal rampage being the emergence of his true self; this view was not shared by director Sam Peckinpah.

The village of St Buryan was used as a location for the filming with some of the locals appearing as extras. Local author Derek Tangye reports in one of his books that they were not aware of the nature of the film at the time of filming, and were most upset to discover on its release that they had been used in a film of a nature so inconsistent with their own moral values.

Censorship
The studio edited the first rape scene before releasing the film in the United States, to earn an R rating from the MPAA.

In the UK, the British Board of Film Classification banned it in accordance with the newly introduced Video Recordings Act. The film had been released theatrically in the United Kingdom, with the uncut version gaining an 'X' rating in 1971 and the slightly cut US R-rated print being rated '18' in 1995. In March 1999 a partially edited print of Straw Dogs, which removed most of the second rape, was refused a video certificate when the distributor lost the rights to the film after agreeing to make the requested BBFC cuts, and the full uncut version was also rejected for video three months later on the grounds that the BBFC could not pass the uncut version so soon after rejecting a cut one.

On July 1, 2002, Straw Dogs finally was certified unedited on VHS and DVD. This version was uncut, and therefore included the second rape scene, in which in the BBFC's opinion "Amy is clearly demonstrated not to enjoy the act of violation". The BBFC wrote that:

Influence
Home Alone production designer John Muto identified that film as a "kids version of Straw Dogs".
Director Jacques Audiard cited Straw Dogs as the basis for his 2015 film Dheepan.

Remake

In 2011, there was a remake of the film, which relocated the story to Mississippi, and changed the lead male's profession from mathematician to screenwriter. It was directed by Rod Lurie and starred James Marsden and Kate Bosworth.

See also
 List of American films of 1971
 List of films featuring home invasions
 The Last House on the Left

References

Sources

External links

Straw Dogs: Home Like No Place an essay by Joshua Clover at the Criterion Collection
Essay by Michael Sragow at Salon.com

1971 films
1970s thriller drama films
1971 independent films
1970s psychological thriller films
ABC Motion Pictures films
American thriller drama films
American psychological thriller films
British thriller drama films
1970s English-language films
Films based on British novels
Films directed by Sam Peckinpah
Films scored by Jerry Fielding
Films set in Cornwall
Films set on farms
Films shot at Twickenham Film Studios
Films shot in Cornwall
Films shot in England
Home invasions in film
Film controversies in the United States
Film controversies in the United Kingdom
Obscenity controversies in film
American rape and revenge films
British rape and revenge films
1971 drama films
1970s American films
1970s British films